Ben is an unincorporated community in Licking County, in the U.S. state of Ohio.

History
A post office called Ben was established in 1895, and remained in operation until 1902.

References

Unincorporated communities in Licking County, Ohio
1895 establishments in Ohio
Unincorporated communities in Ohio